Carl Meyer may refer to:

 Sir Carl Meyer, 1st Baronet (1851–1922), banker
 Carl Meyer (rower) (born 1981), New Zealand rower
 Carl Meyer (rugby union) (born 1991), South African rugby player
 Carl Walther Meyer (born 1898), German film actor
 Carl Meyer (architect), German architect of, among many works, the Gasworks building, Bydgoszcz

See also
 Carl Mayer (disambiguation)
 Karl Meyer (disambiguation)